Dynamic modulus (sometimes complex modulus) is the ratio of stress to strain under vibratory conditions (calculated from data obtained from either free or forced vibration tests, in shear, compression, or elongation).  It is a property of viscoelastic materials.

Viscoelastic stress–strain phase-lag 

Viscoelasticity is studied using dynamic mechanical analysis where an oscillatory force (stress) is applied to a material and the resulting displacement (strain) is measured.
In purely elastic materials the stress and strain occur in phase, so that the response of one occurs simultaneously with the other.
In purely viscous materials, there is a phase difference between stress and strain, where strain lags stress by a 90 degree ( radian) phase lag.
Viscoelastic materials exhibit behavior somewhere in between that of purely viscous and purely elastic materials, exhibiting some phase lag in strain.

Stress and strain in a viscoelastic material can be represented using the following expressions:
Strain: 
Stress:  
where 
 where  is frequency of strain oscillation,
 is time,
 is phase lag between stress and strain.

The stress relaxation modulus  is the ratio of the stress remaining at time  after a step strain  was applied at time :
,

which is the time-dependent generalization of Hooke's law.
For visco-elastic solids,  converges to the equilibrium shear modulus:
.

Storage and loss modulus 

The storage and loss modulus in viscoelastic materials measure the stored energy, representing the elastic portion, and the energy dissipated as heat, representing the viscous portion. The tensile storage and loss moduli are defined as follows:
Storage:  
Loss:  

 
where  is the  imaginary unit.

Ratio between loss and storage modulus 

Tensile: 

Shear: 

For a material with a  greater than 1, the energy-dissipating, viscous component of the complex modulus prevails.

See also
Dynamic mechanical analysis
 Elastic modulus
 Palierne equation

References

Physical quantities
Solid mechanics
Non-Newtonian fluids